Jeevaneesh Soundararajah is a Singaporean athlete. He represented Singapore in the men's 5000 metres at the 2015 Southeast Asian Games and 1500 metres at the 2021 Southeast Asian Games. On 8 January 2022, he won the Pocari Sweat 2.4 km challenge with a national mark of 6:52.97; he lowered this mark by 2 seconds in the second edition of the race seven months later. In April 2022, he won the bronze in the 1500 metres at the Singapore Open with a time of 4:00.99. As a schoolboy, he won the 1500 metres and cross-country events at the "A" Division National School Games, and was the first person to go below 15 minutes for the latter.

References

Competitors at the 2021 Southeast Asian Games
Living people
Singaporean male athletes
1993 births